Electrical Audio is a recording facility founded in Chicago, Illinois by musician and recording engineer Steve Albini in 1997. Hundreds of independent music projects have been recorded there. Unlike most producers, Albini refuses to take any royalties from musicians who record at the studio.

Founded during an era of increasing popularity for digital recording, Electrical Audio was unusual for using only analog recording technology, including mixing consoles, tape recorders and many outboard sound effects. The rooms are also designed to offer natural reverberation rather than adding the quality in post-production.

In a 2007 post on the studio's message board, the studio's technician Greg Norman revealed that the studio had acquired a Pro Tools rig for computer-aided recording and editing, saying it had become "as important to have as a piano". Norman also went on to write that Albini, who dislikes digital recording, "won't be recording with [Pro Tools]. So don't ask him about it."

Studio layout

The facility was built by gutting an existing building and customizing the space to Albini's specifications, including walls made of adobe bricks shipped from New Mexico. Electrical Audio comprises two separate studios, A and B.

Studio A
Studio A is the larger of the two studios and has three separate performance rooms. The control room runs a 48 channel Neotek Elite console and can accommodate up to 132 inputs.

Studio B
Studio B is the smaller of the two studios with an  live room and a  isolation room. The control room runs a 36 input Neotek Series II console.

Product manufacturing
Electrical Audio produces a two channel microphone preamp and Mid Side Matrix.  They were listed for sale starting in 2013.

See also
List of Steve Albini's recording projects, many of which were recorded at Electrical Audio

References

External links
Electrical Audio official website
List of current and former Electrical Audio employees

Recording studios in the United States